The Man From Santa Clara is a western novel by Donald Hamilton. (It was years later re-released as The Two-Shoot Gun.)

Plot summary
Photographer Alexander Burdick drives his old mule-drawn army ambulance and a smooth-bore shotgun to the New Mexico Territory and into a range war.

Publication history
1960, US, Dell, Dell First Edition B170, paperback
1971, US, Fawcett Publications, as The Two-Shoot Gun, Gold Medal R2492, paperback, reissued several times

1960 American novels
Western (genre) novels
Novels by Donald Hamilton
Novels set in New Mexico